Haloperidol decanoate, sold under the brand name Haldol Decanoate among others, is a typical antipsychotic which is used in the treatment of schizophrenia. It is administered by injection into muscle at a dose of 100 to 200 mg once every 4 weeks or monthly. The dorsogluteal site is recommended. A 3.75-cm (1.5-inch), 21-gauge needle is generally used, but obese individuals may require a 6.5-cm (2.5-inch) needle to ensure that the drug is indeed injected intramuscularly and not subcutaneously. Haloperidol decanoate is provided in the form of 50 or 100 mg/mL oil solution of sesame oil and benzyl alcohol in ampoules or pre-filled syringes. Its elimination half-life after multiple doses is 21 days. The medication is marketed in many countries throughout the world.

See also
 List of antipsychotics § Antipsychotic esters

References

4-Phenylpiperidines
Antipsychotic esters
Butyrophenone antipsychotics
Chloroarenes
Decanoate esters
Fluoroarenes
Johnson & Johnson brands
Janssen Pharmaceutica
NMDA receptor antagonists
Prodrugs
Prolactin releasers
Suspected embryotoxicants
Suspected fetotoxicants
Tertiary alcohols
Typical antipsychotics